Grand Duchess Maria may refer to:

 Grand Duchess Maria Alexandrovna of Russia (1853-1920), Companion of the Order of the Crown of India
 Grand Duchess Maria Nikolaevna of Russia (1899-1918), Eastern Orthodox saint
 Grand Duchess Maria Nikolaievna, Duchess of Leuchtenberg (1819-1876), President of the Imperial Academy of Arts
 Grand Duchess Maria Pavlovna of Russia (1786-1859), third daughter of Paul I of Russia and Sophie Dorothea of Württemberg
 Grand Duchess Maria Pavlovna of Russia (1854-1920), Russian expatriate
 Grand Duchess Maria Pavlovna of Russia (1890-1958), Russian nurse
 Maria Teresa, Grand Duchess of Luxembourg (born 1956), grand ducal consort of Grand Duke Henri of Luxembourg
 Maria Vladimirovna, Grand Duchess of Russia (born 1953), disputed pretender to the Russian throne

See also

 Archduchess Maria (disambiguation)
 Duchess Maria (disambiguation)